In mathematics, any Lagrangian system generally admits gauge symmetries, though it may happen that they are trivial. In theoretical physics, the notion of gauge symmetries depending on parameter functions is a cornerstone of contemporary field theory. 

Therefore, a gauge symmetry of 
For instance, this is the case of gauge symmetries in classical field theory. Yang–Mills gauge theory and gauge gravitation theory exemplify classical field theories with gauge symmetries. 

Gauge symmetries possess the following two peculiarities.
 Being Lagrangian symmetries, gauge symmetries of a Lagrangian satisfy Noether's first theorem, but the corresponding conserved current  takes a particular superpotential form   where the first term  vanishes on solutions of the Euler–Lagrange equations and the second one is a boundary term, where  is called a superpotential.
 In accordance with Noether's second theorem, there is one-to-one correspondence between the gauge symmetries of a Lagrangian and the Noether identities which the Euler–Lagrange operator satisfies. Consequently, gauge symmetries characterize the degeneracy of a Lagrangian system.

Note that, in quantum field theory, a generating functional fail to be invariant under gauge transformations, and gauge symmetries are replaced with the BRST symmetries, depending on ghosts and acting both on fields and ghosts.

See also
Gauge theory (mathematics)
Lagrangian system
Noether identities
Gauge theory
Gauge symmetry
Yang–Mills theory
Gauge group (mathematics)
Gauge gravitation theory

Notes

References
 Daniel, M., Viallet, C., The geometric setting of gauge symmetries of the Yang–Mills type, Rev. Mod. Phys. 52 (1980) 175.
 Eguchi, T., Gilkey, P., Hanson, A., Gravitation, gauge theories and differential geometry, Phys. Rep. 66 (1980) 213.
 Gotay, M., Marsden, J.,  Stress-energy-momentum tensors and the Belinfante–Rosenfeld formula,  Contemp. Math. 132 (1992) 367.
 Marathe, K., Martucci, G., The Mathematical Foundation of Gauge Theories (North Holland, 1992)  .
 Fatibene, L., Ferraris, M., Francaviglia, M., Noether formalism for conserved quantities in classical gauge field theories, J. Math. Phys. 35 (1994) 1644.
 Gomis, J., Paris, J., Samuel, S., Antibracket, antifields and gauge theory quantization, Phys. Rep. 295 (1995) 1; arXiv: hep-th/9412228.
 Giachetta, G. (2008), Mangiarotti, L., Sardanashvily, G., On the notion of gauge symmetries of generic Lagrangian field theory,  J. Math. Phys. 50 (2009) 012903; arXiv: 0807.3003.
 Giachetta, G. (2009), Mangiarotti, L., Sardanashvily, G., Advanced Classical Field Theory (World Scientific, 2009) .
 
 

Symmetry
Gauge theories